Richard E. Romey (March 12, 1905 – July 16, 1980) was an American football player. He played professionally  at the end position for the Chicago Bulls of the first American Football League in 1926. Prior to his professional career, Romey played college football at the University of Iowa.

References

External links
 

1905 births
1980 deaths
American football ends
Chicago Bulls (American football) players
Iowa Hawkeyes football players
People from Mason City, Iowa
Players of American football from Iowa